Takashi Ishii is the name of

 Takashi Ishii (film director) (石井隆, born 1946), Japanese film director, screenwriter and manga artist
 Takashi Ishii (runner) (石井隆士, born 1954), Japanese runner and medalist in the 1981 Asian Athletics Championships
 Takashi Ishii (baseball) (石井貴, born 1971), Japanese baseball pitcher and coach